Gibson Sanda Jalo   (1 March 1939 – 10 January 2000) was a Nigerian Army lieutenant general, who was the Chief of Army Staff (COAS) from April 1980 until October 1981. He also served as the Chief of Defence Staff from 1981 to 1983 during the Nigerian Second Republic.

Birth and education
Jalo was born on 1 March 1939 at Demsa in Adamawa State.  He attended Yola Middle School (1950–1953) and Government College Keffi (1953–1958).  He enlisted into the Infantry corps of the Royal Nigerian Military Force in 1959.  He took the Regular Officers Cadet training course at the Royal West African Frontier Force Training School, Teshi in Ghana and subsequently attended MONS Officer Cadet School in Aldershot, UK.  He was commissioned as Second Lieutenant as of 4 November 1960.  While in service he took the Platoon Commander Tactics Course at the Nigerian Military Training College, the Joint Services Staff Course at Latner, United Kingdom, and also studied at the National Defence College, India.

Army career

Jalo's promotion history was Lieutenant: 7 April 62, Captain: 20 September 64, Major: 10 June 67, Lt Colonel: 11 May 68, Colonel: 1 April 70, Brigadier General: 1 October 73, Major General: 1 January 76, Lt General: 15 April 80.
His first posting was with the 2 Brigade Transport Company, after which he became ADC to the General Officer Commanding Royal Nigerian Army.
After a series of commands in the infantry, he was appointed Commandant of the Nigeria Defence Academy, GOC 3 Infantry Division, Deputy Chief of Army Staff, Chief of Army Staff and finally Chief of Defence Staff.

References

External link

Nigerian generals
Nigerian Army officers
1939 births
2000 deaths
People from Adamawa State
Nigerian Defence Academy Commandants
Chiefs of Army Staff (Nigeria)
Graduates of the Mons Officer Cadet School
National Defence College, India alumni